The Last Letter from Your Lover is a 2021 British romantic drama film directed by Augustine Frizzell and written by Nick Payne and Esta Spalding, based on Jojo Moyes' 2012 novel of the same name. It stars Felicity Jones, Callum Turner, Joe Alwyn, Nabhaan Rizwan and Shailene Woodley.

Set in two distinct time periods the novel follows two women, 1960s housewife Jennifer Stirling and modern-day journalist Ellie Haworth and how both of them become intrigued by a letter they accidentally discover.

The Last Letter from Your Lover was released on Netflix in select territories on 23 July 2021, and in the United Kingdom on 6 August 2021, by StudioCanal.

Plot
In the mid-1960s, wealthy socialite Jennifer Stirling suffers from memory loss after a car crash. Unable to remember much of her life before or connect with her husband Laurence, Jennifer is intrigued by a letter she finds between "J" and "Boot". She decides to try and remember what happened to her by following clues from the letter.

In modern day London, Ellie Haworth, who recently broke up with her long-time boyfriend, has to write an article about the recently-deceased editor of her paper. Getting past the formal archivist Rory to access the editor's archive, she finds a misfiled love letter, to someone identified as "J", from "Boot". Moved by the passionate feelings between the mysterious couple, Ellie becomes determined to learn their identities and how their love story ended.

In the past, a pre-crash Jennifer and her husband Laurence travel to the French Riviera for a summer vacation. Foreign correspondent Anthony O'Hare arrives to interview Laurence about his business success. At the party, Laurence is condescending to both Jennifer and Anthony. Afterwards, a drunk Anthony complains about the awful company to a fellow guest and is caught by Jennifer. Anthony returns the next morning with a written apology, which Jennifer forces him to read aloud. Anthony invites the Stirlings out to eat the next day, but Laurence is called away on a sudden business trip, leaving Jennifer and Anthony to spend the summer together until his return. They begin writing letters to each other, under the pennames "J" and "Boot" (or "B"). Neither act on their growing electricity, until Jennifer impulsively tries to kiss him. When he pulls away, she flees. Some days later, a letter penned by Anthony reaches her, proposing to meet at Postman's Park in London.

They start a whirlwind affair, spending moments together where Jennifer can safely be with Anthony. Finally, he proposes she run off with him to New York. Jennifer is hesitant to leave, in fear of being treated as outcast by her family and friends. After Anthony sends her a letter that he will be waiting for her at the train station on the night of his departure, Jennifer rushes off to meet him. Just before she can arrive, she gets into a car crash, with a blow to her head causing partial amnesia. Anthony leaves for New York, believing that Jennifer has rejected him.

Six months after the car crash, Laurence hides the last letter Jennifer received from Anthony in effort to prevent her from remembering the affair. Jennifer feels lost as she struggles to recover her memories. She begins finding several of the love letters from "Boot" hidden in her house, leading her to discover a postal box in her name that Laurence had closed. Jennifer confronts Laurence, who claims Anthony had died in the crash. Four years later, Jennifer bumps into Anthony, restoring her memories of their time together. Anthony once again pleads for her to run away with him, but she refuses out of consideration for her two-year old-daughter. Enraged at Laurence for his lies, Jennifer asserts that she will stay with him because of their daughter, but vows to leave if he mistreats her. In turn, Laurence threatens to ruin Jennifer's reputation and gain sole custody of their daughter, as she would only be seen as an adulteress by the court of law. This prompts Jennifer to escape with their daughter to go with Anthony. After finding out he has checked out of his hotel, she tries finding him at his workplace, but is informed by the editor that Anthony has already left. Forced to return to Laurence, Jennifer gives the bundle of love letters to the editor to be sent to Anthony if they hear back from him.

In the present day, Ellie and Rory grow closer as they uncover more of the love letters. After spending the night with Rory, Ellie distances herself from him. She learns that Jennifer and Anthony are both alive and goes to speak with them. After hearing their regrets and pain over their lost romance, Ellie decides to enter into a relationship with Rory, choosing to give romance another try and not live with regrets. Ellie returns to Anthony and encourages him to write one last letter to Jennifer, in which he asks her to meet him once again at Postman's Park. Ellie and Rory watch from a distance as the two lovers reunite.

Cast
 Felicity Jones as Ellie Haworth, a young journalist who uncovers a series of love letters in the archives in present-day London
 Callum Turner as Anthony O'Hare, a financial journalist who is writing a story about Laurence in the 1960s, Jennifer's lover
 Ben Cross as older Anthony O'Hare
 Joe Alwyn as Laurence Stirling, the husband of Jennifer Stirling in the 1960s who is a successful but stern industrialist
 Nabhaan Rizwan as Rory McCallan, an archivist who is a colleague of Haworth
 Shailene Woodley as Jennifer Stirling, a socialite in the 1960s who has a perfect life, Laurence's wife, Anthony's lover
 Diana Kent as older Jennifer Stirling
 Ncuti Gatwa as Nick, a co-worker of Haworth
 Emma Appleton as Hannah
 Zoe Boyle as Anne

Production
In August 2019 it was announced that Augustine Frizzell would direct the film. It was announced that filming was set to begin on 14 October 2019 in Mallorca, and that Felicity Jones and Shailene Woodley would star and serve as executive producers. Production moved to the United Kingdom and wrapped after 45 days on 15 December 2019.

Release
In October 2019, Netflix acquired U.S. distribution rights to the film, and other international territories. It was released on Netflix in select territories on 23 July 2021. It was released in the United Kingdom and Ireland on 6 August 2021.

Reception
On the review aggregator website Rotten Tomatoes, the film holds an approval rating of 56% based on 68 reviews, with an average rating of 5.6/10. On Metacritic, the film has a weighted average score of 57 out of 100 based on 19 critic reviews, indicating "mixed or average reviews".

References

External links

2021 films
2021 romantic drama films
2020s British films
2020s English-language films
British romantic drama films
Films about amnesia
Films about journalists
Films based on British novels
Films based on romance novels
Films directed by Augustine Frizzell
Films scored by Daniel Hart
Films set in the 1960s
Films set in London
Films set on the French Riviera
Films shot in Mallorca
Films shot in the United Kingdom
StudioCanal films